The Université populaire de Caen (Popular University or People's University of Caen) is a free university created in October 2002 by Michel Onfray in the north-western French city of Caen. It functions on a guiding principle of exemption from fees. Access to the Popular University does not require any academic qualifications, and is open to all. It does not have any examinations nor does it award diplomas.

Teaching venues 
The seminars of the university take place in the following locations: 

 Tocqueville amphitheatre, University of Caen
 Mancel coffee, Caen Castle
 Museum of the Fine arts of Caen, Caen Castle
 Room in the Panta Theatre, Caen

See also 
Collège international de philosophie

External links 
Université populaire de Caen
Homepage of the Université Populaire de Lyon
Printemps des Universités Populaire
The above information is taken from the French Wikipedia article on the subject.

Popular education
Free universities
Educational institutions established in 2002
2002 establishments in France